Thomas Brooke, 8th Baron Cobham (died 19 July 1529), lord of the Manor of Cobham, Kent, was an English peer.

Thomas Brooke was the son and heir of Sir John Brooke, 7th Baron Cobham (-1512) and Margaret Neville (-1506)., daughter of Edward Neville, 3rd Baron Bergavenny, and his second wife, Catherine Howard.

Career
Thomas took part in the wars with France and was at the Siege of Tournay in 1513, and fought at the Battle of the Spurs on 16 August 1513.

He was made Knight Banneret by King Henry VIII in 1514, and attended the Field of the Cloth of Gold in 1520.

He was summoned to Parliament from 1514 to 1523.

In 1521 he was one of the twelve Barons for the trial of the Duke of Buckingham.

Family
Thomas Brooke married Dorothy Heydon, daughter of Sir Henry Heydon of Baconsthorpe and Anne, daughter of Sir Geoffrey Boleyn and Anne Hoo. They had seven sons and six daughters. His daughter Elizabeth Brooke married Sir Thomas Wyatt.

He was twice widowed. He married secondly Elizabeth Calthorpe (d.1517), the daughter of Sir Philip Calthorpe of Burnham Thorpe, Norfolk, widow of Sir Robert Southwell and thirdly Elizabeth Hart, and had no issue from them.

Thomas Brooke died on 19 July 1529 and was buried at St Mary Magdalene New Churchyard, Cobham, Kent.

References

1529 deaths
Knights banneret of England
8
Thomas